Green Bank Halt railway station was a station in Coalbrookdale, Shropshire, England. The station was opened in 1934 and closed in 1962.

References

Further reading

Disused railway stations in Shropshire
Railway stations in Great Britain opened in 1934
Railway stations in Great Britain closed in 1962
Former Great Western Railway stations